The Bandini-Maserati 1500 is a racing car, produced in 1953 by Bandini Automobili.

In the 1950s, non-exclusive trade agreements between Ilario Bandini and Italian-American Tony Pompeo, provided for the export of cars with no engine to be installed in a second manufacturing process in the United States].
More and more cars like the sport siluro were exported, containing Siata, Offenhauser, Saab, MG and Alfa Romeo engines.

In particular this car, which results from the registers Bandini, have been exported on February 15, 1954, was designed and built in 1952 to house the Maserati A6  engine and run in the category FM League SCCA (Sports Car Club of America). The chronicles record its use by the American drivers Bernhard Vihl, George Parrington and David Michaels and it also raced in the 12 Hours of Sebring in March 1955.

The chassis

The chassis, built at Bandini cars, used design, structure and types of material that had ensured in the sporttorpedo good results in terms of lightness, road holding and speed.

 Structure and material: frame of elliptical section tubes, special steel aeronautics derivation;
 Suspension:
 Front: Independent, triangles overlapping with shock hydraulic telescopic tilted and springs cylindrical helical coaxial; bar Account
 Rear: a bridge with two rigid leaf spring semi-ellipticle longitudinal and hydraulic telescopic 
 Braking system:
 Service: hydraulics, drum front and rear
 Steering: a worm wheel and twisted
 Wheels: Borrani Ray
 Fuel tank: 
 Transmission: transmission shaft rea central differential and halfshafts
 Weight overall version: n.d.

The engine Maserati A6
 Positioning: forward longitudinal, 6-cylinder in-line
 Materials and particularity: base and cup and cylinder head alloy, single camshaft, 12-valve V-71.5 ° head
 Bore: 
 Stroke: 
 Displacement unit: 248.03 cc
 Displacement total: 1488.2 cc
 Power: 3 twin-choke Weber carburetors
 Compression ratio: 7.8:1
 Power: 75 CV @ 4700 rpm
 Lubricate: Forced
 Cooling: forced cooler
 Gearbox and clutch: 4-speed manual + reverse,  single dry disc
 Ignition and electrical equipment: coil and distributor on base, battery 12 volt and generator

The body

The body was made entirely of aluminum by the bodyshop Motto Committee by the Ilario Bandini. It is of two-seater sports configuration.
 
The dimensions are very similar to  the First Bandini of 1946; as the air-intake and windshield recall those of 1100 sports, but the front grid for vertical and horizontal elements, although it is larger, has a shape that binds inextricably to torpedo sports. The front side plates and the tail, however, free of material roundness, shall inspired ideas that found practical application five years later with the Saponetta.

See also

 Ilario Bandini
 Bandini Cars

References

Bandini vehicles
Sports racing cars
Cars introduced in 1954